Shi Kang (石康) is a modern Chinese writer born in 1968.  His novel "晃晃悠悠"(Loafing Around) is sometimes described as being a bit like Catcher in the Rye and has been very popular in China.  It was turned into a play in 2005.  Huang Huang You You( Loafing Around),along with Zhi Li Po Sui (Torn to Pieces) and Yi Ta Hu Tu (Completely Muddled),are known as the Youth Trilogy of Shi Kang. As a prolific screenwriter, Shi Kang wrote the popular TV show Struggle in 2007, which was considered as "the bible for people born in the 1980s". Also, Shi Kang is a co-writer of Feng Xiaogang's 2002 Spring Festival comedy smash, Big Shot's Funeral (Da wan).

His novels have not yet been translated into English.

Works
 "支离破碎" (Torn to Pieces)
 "晃晃悠悠" (Loafing Around)
 "一塌糊涂" (Completely Muddled)
 "在一起"
 "心碎你好"
 "北京姑娘"
 "鸡一嘴鸭一嘴"
 "激情与迷茫"
 "过山车"
 "口吐莲花"

External links
a discussion of Shi Kang
Some of his works
Description of "Loafing Around" performed as a play
Shi Kang's Blog

1968 births
Living people
Writers from Beijing